Frank Mill (born 23 July 1958) is a German former professional footballer who was a member of the 1990 FIFA World Cup winning squad of West Germany. Further, he participated at the 1984 and at the 1988 Summer Olympics, where he won the bronze medal with the West German team.

Career
The son of a junk dealer,  Mill began his career at the age of six at local side Eintracht Essen before joining the youth ranks of Essen's biggest club, Rot-Weiss Essen, in 1972. Starting job training to become a florist (his mother owned a flower shop), Mill signed his first professional contract with Rot-Weiss in 1976. Essen was a Bundesliga side in his debut season, a campaign in which his three goals (in a total of 19 appearances) couldn't prevent the team from dropping down to 2. Bundesliga North. In that division he grew to become a reliable hitman, scoring 71 goals for Rot-Weiss (at times alongside Horst Hrubesch) over the next four seasons, forty of those in just 38 appearances during 1979–80. This tally made him the top goalscorer of 2. Bundesliga Nord, making him a prime target for a transfer, and in 1981 he was to return to the Bundesliga upon being signed by Jupp Heynckes of Borussia Mönchengladbach.

At Mönchengladbach he kept on scoring, netting fourteen goals in his first year under contract. Only eight months into his life at Bökelberg he was called up by Jupp Derwall to represent West Germany for the first time in his career. On 21 March 1982, he featured in a friendly against Brazil in Rio de Janeiro. A back injury forced him out of the West German squad for the 1982 FIFA World Cup tournament, and also hampered his scoring abilities during the next season. In 1983–84 he recaptured his place as Mönchengladbach's top scorer, firing nineteen goals past opposing goalkeepers that season. Missing out on the Bundesliga title on the final day (and only on goal difference) to VfB Stuttgart, Mönchengladbach then had to deal with a second major blow, as the team also lost the DFB-Pokal final on penalties against Bayern Munich (with his Bayern Munich-bound team-mate Lothar Matthäus failing to score from the spot in the shoot-out). Mill scored the only Mönchengladbach goal in normal time during that match.

Later that summer Mill participated in the 1984 Summer Olympics, and he was still Borussia Mönchengladbach's best striker when fellow Bundesliga side Borussia Dortmund persuaded him to switch over to them at the end of the 1985–86 Bundesliga season. Although Mönchengladbach was receiving adequate compensation (1.3 million DM) for his services, the move remained somewhat in the balance for a couple of weeks as Dortmund had to first go through three relegation play-offs to ensure their Bundesliga future. Once signed, however, Mill inspired Dortmund to a less troubled 1986–87 season, the striker's seventeen goals in 31 appearances helping Dortmund up to a fourth-place finish and a berth in the UEFA Cup the following season – although he had to suffer enduring mocking for failing to score from an open goal against Bayern Munich on the opening day. His scoring punch made him a popular figure at Westfalenstadion immediately, subsequently earning him the role of team captain. Outside of his club, he was part of the host nation's squad at Euro 1988. Increasingly popular and seen as a role model, a disagreement over Mill's captaincy and his role within the Dortmund squad between the club's chairman, Dr. Gerd Niebaum, and manager, Reinhard Saftig, resulted in the latter being replaced by Horst Köppel, leaving no doubt that the chairman's view regarding Mill's role had prevailed.

Mill looked a bit out of form after Köppel's take over: although he had won bronze with Germany at the 1988 Summer Olympics, his once impressive scoring quota had begun to fade. Still, he remained an important player for his club and was part of the Dortmund team that lifted the DFB-Pokal trophy in 1989, beating favourites Werder Bremen in the final. At that time Mill was kind of an ageing marksman, but in 1990 Franz Beckenbauer rewarded his durability with a place in the West German squad for the 1990 World Cup. However, with proven goalscorer Rudi Völler and youngsters Jürgen Klinsmann and Karlheinz Riedle all well in front of him in Beckenbauer's thoughts, he remained the unused fourth-choice striker during those successful weeks in Italy.

At club level Mill's fading punch in front of the goal saw him go through a transformation from scorer to assist winner, but this still couldn't prevent him from being forced out to the fringes of the Borussia Dortmund first-team. In 1991, Köppel departed as manager and his successor, Ottmar Hitzfeld, started to set his stamp on the development of the club. With Stephane Chapuisat and Flemming Povlsen Hitzfeld's regular picks in the Dortmund frontline, Mill was usually placed in a sub-role and, at the end of Hitzfeld's debut season in charge of the club, 1991–92, missed out on the Bundesliga title again - for the second time in his career and in almost identical circumstances: on goal difference and due to final day action, with VfB Stuttgart finishing as champions. They entered the UEFA Cup and reached the final, losing to Juventus.

Still a fan favourite at Westfalenstadion, Mill saw out his deal with the club in 1994 to join promoted Fortuna Düsseldorf in the 2nd Bundesliga. There he enjoyed two more seasons in the game, scoring five times in his first season at Rheinstadion, efforts that helped Fortuna return to the Bundesliga. His final twelve months as a professional, during the 1995–96 season, saw him esperience a bright start with two goals in the first three matches. He couldn't add any more in his next 26 appearances for Düsseldorf, however, and his final Bundesliga totals were 123 goals in 387 appearances for Borussia Mönchengladbach, Borussia Dortmund and Fortuna Düsseldorf.

Shortly after the end of his career, Fortuna Düsseldorf offered him a role as a director in their management, a role he later left by mutual consent following a lack of success.

Honours
Borussia Mönchengladbach
 DFB-Pokal: Runner-up 1983–84

Borussia Dortmund
 DFB-Pokal: 1988–89
 UEFA Cup: Runner-up 1992–93

West Germany
 World Cup: 1990
 Olympics: Bronze Medal: 1988

References

External links
 
 

1958 births
Living people
Footballers from Essen
Association football forwards
German footballers
Rot-Weiss Essen players
Borussia Mönchengladbach players
Borussia Dortmund players
Fortuna Düsseldorf players
Germany international footballers
Olympic footballers of West Germany
West German footballers
Olympic bronze medalists for West Germany
Footballers at the 1984 Summer Olympics
Footballers at the 1988 Summer Olympics
UEFA Euro 1988 players
1990 FIFA World Cup players
FIFA World Cup-winning players
Germany under-21 international footballers
Bundesliga players
2. Bundesliga players
Olympic medalists in football
Medalists at the 1988 Summer Olympics